Absorptance of the surface of a material is its effectiveness in absorbing radiant energy. It is the ratio of the absorbed to the incident radiant power. This should not be confused with absorbance and absorption coefficient.

Mathematical definitions

Hemispherical absorptance
Hemispherical absorptance of a surface, denoted A, is defined as

where
Φea is the radiant flux absorbed by that surface;
Φei is the radiant flux received by that surface.

Spectral hemispherical absorptance
Spectral hemispherical absorptance in frequency and spectral hemispherical absorptance in wavelength of a surface, denoted Aν and Aλ respectively, are defined as

where
Φe,νa is the spectral radiant flux in frequency absorbed by that surface;
Φe,νi is the spectral radiant flux in frequency received by that surface;
Φe,λa is the spectral radiant flux in wavelength absorbed by that surface;
Φe,λi is the spectral radiant flux in wavelength received by that surface.

Directional absorptance
Directional absorptance of a surface, denoted AΩ, is defined as

where
Le,Ωa is the radiance absorbed by that surface;
Le,Ωi is the radiance received by that surface.

Spectral directional absorptance
Spectral directional absorptance in frequency and spectral directional absorptance in wavelength of a surface, denoted Aν,Ω and Aλ,Ω respectively, are defined as

where
Le,Ω,νa is the spectral radiance in frequency absorbed by that surface;
Le,Ω,νi is the spectral radiance received by that surface;
Le,Ω,λa is the spectral radiance in wavelength absorbed by that surface;
Le,Ω,λi is the spectral radiance in wavelength received by that surface.

Other radiometric coefficients

References

Physical quantities
Radiometry